Slimane Zengli (born 17 April 1965) is an Algerian boxer. He competed at the 1988 Summer Olympics and the 1992 Summer Olympics.

References

External links
 

1965 births
Living people
Algerian male boxers
Olympic boxers of Algeria
Boxers at the 1988 Summer Olympics
Boxers at the 1992 Summer Olympics
Place of birth missing (living people)
Bantamweight boxers
21st-century Algerian people
20th-century Algerian people